The Beaurains Treasure (or Arras Treasure) is the name of an important Roman hoard found in Beaurains, a suburb of the city of Arras, northern France in 1922. Soon after its discovery, much of the treasure was dispersed, to be sold on the antiquities market. The largest portion of the hoard can be found in the local museum in Arras and in the British Museum.

Discovery
The treasure was accidentally discovered inside a pottery vessel during building work at Beaurains, Pas-de-Calais on 21 September 1922. Two Belgian workmen were digging for clay when they unearthed the treasure a short depth underground. Unfortunately, much of the treasure disappeared overnight and a great part of it was sold on the antiquities market. Items from the Beaurains Treasure are now found in collections worldwide, but the two institutions with the greatest proportion of the hoard are the Musée d'Arras and the British Museum.

Description
The Beaurains Treasure is principally composed of coins, although other luxury items are included in the hoard. There are twenty-three pieces of jewellery (necklaces, bracelets, earrings, buckles, finger rings, cameos and pendants), silver objects (a lamp stand or candelabra, two spoons and an ingot) and 472 coins that were kept in a (now lost) silver container, including at least 25 gold medallions issued during the reign of Constantine I. The medallions were minted in Trier and Rome and were probably gifts received by the owner of the treasure during his career as officer of the imperial army between 285 and 310 A.D. Their value ranges from four to ten aurei, and from one and a half to nine solidi. One of the medallions was issued to celebrate the reconquest of Britannia by Constantius I in 296 A.D, the reverse of which is denoted by an image of Londinium, represented by a woman welcoming the Emperor on her knees outside the city walls. The original is kept in Arras, with a copy in the British Museum.

See also
 Chaourse Treasure
 Caubiac Treasure
 Chatuzange Treasure
 Mâcon Treasure

Gallery

References

Further reading
 D. Strong, Greek and Roman Silver Plate (British Museum Press, 1966)
 L. Burn, The British Museum Book of Greek and Roman Art (British Museum Press, 1991)
 S. Walker, Roman Art (British Museum Press, 1991)
 P. Bastienand & C. Metzger, Le Trésor de Beaurains (dit d'Arras), Arras, 1977

1922 archaeological discoveries
Archaeological discoveries in Europe
Archaeological discoveries in France
Ancient Greek and Roman objects in the British Museum
Treasure troves of France
Treasure troves of late antiquity
Silver objects
Ancient Roman metalwork